Elliott B. Broidy (born 1956/1957) is an American former lobbyist and businessman. From 2005 to 2008, he served as finance chairman of the Republican National Committee (RNC). In 2009, he was convicted in a public corruption and bribery case in New York.

From 2017 to April 2018 he was a deputy finance chairman of the RNC, resigning after The Wall Street Journal reported that he had been a party to a non-disclosure agreement with former Playboy Playmate Shera Bechard, under which he paid $1.6 million for her silence about a sexual affair between them. As of May 2019, the United States Department of Justice was investigating Broidy's business and political dealings.

In October 2020, Broidy pleaded guilty to acting as an unregistered foreign agent working for Chinese and Malaysian interests. He sought to lobby the highest levels of the U.S. Government to deport a dissident of the People's Republic of China (PRC) living in the United States, and tried to arrange meetings for a PRC Minister with the Attorney General, the Secretary of Homeland Security, and other high-level officials during the PRC Minister's visit to the United States, all while concealing the foreign principals he represented. He had been charged as part of a federal probe into efforts to influence the Trump administration to stop investigations about a 1MDB Malaysian state fund fraud. On January 20, 2021, Broidy was pardoned by President Donald Trump.

Early life
Broidy is the son of Sherman G. Broidy (1924–2014), an educator and property developer, and Dorothy Horowitz, a nurse, and was raised in Westwood. He is Jewish.

Broidy says he put himself through the University of Southern California "working as a commercial salmon fisherman" and that he "saved $10,000 and bought an East Los Angeles laundromat that he visited almost every day." Broidy graduated from USC where he received a Bachelor of Science degree in Accounting and Finance. He was a Certified Public Accountant from 1982 to 1993.

Career

Business
Broidy began his career in finance at Arthur Andersen in the tax department. One of his clients, Glen Bell, the founder of Taco Bell, hired him to manage his personal investments. He was the managing director at Bell Enterprises from 1982 to 1991. In 1991, he founded Broidy Capital Management, an investment firm, serving as its chairman and chief executive officer.

In the early 2000s, he established Markstone through which he invested in Israeli firms. Broidy met with Benjamin Netanyahu, who was finance minister of Israel at the time. He raised $800 million for Markstone primarily with close cooperation of elected managers of government workers' pension funds in California, New York, and other states, as well as the city of Los Angeles which he was on the board of trustees for the Los Angeles Fire and Police Pension fund. In 2014, Markstone failed and all the investors lost money.

Broidy served as chairman of ESI Holdings, an event management firm. He served as commissioner and chairman of the Alternative Investment Committee of the Los Angeles City Fire and Police Pension Fund from 2002 to 2009.

Becoming interested in politics after the 9/11 attacks, he joined the Republican Jewish Coalition and ultimately became a member of the board of directors, a position he still holds as of 2019. Between 2002 and 2004 he became a “Super Ranger", donating more than $300,000 to the George W. Bush 2004 presidential campaign. From 2004 to 2006 he raised campaign funds for many Republican candidates. In October 2006, he hosted a fundraiser for Bush, where $1 million was raised. Later that year, he was appointed by Homeland Security Secretary Michael Chertoff to the Homeland Security Advisory Council as well as the Terrorism Task Force and New Technology Task Force.

He led the fund raising for Republicans from 2005 to 2008 as finance chairman for the Republican National Committee (RNC) including the 2008 elections involving John McCain and Sarah Palin and, for the 2016 elections, he was a top fund raiser for Ted Cruz, Lindsey Graham, Marco Rubio, and Donald Trump. From April 2017 until April 13, 2018, he was a deputy finance chairman of the RNC. According to Bruce Bialosky of the Republican Jewish Coalition "A lot of people talked a big game, but when he said he could raise big money, he actually did."

In addition to his other activities, Broidy was the executive producer of two independent films: Sugar and Snake and Mongoose (both 2013).

Business and Lobbying with George Nader 
In 2014, Broidy purchased the Virginia-based private security company Circinus LLC, which provided services to the United States and other governments. The company claims to have hundreds of millions of dollars in contracts with the United Arab Emirates. After meeting with both Jared Kushner and later President Donald Trump in October 2017 at the White House and discussing Circinus with the President during which Broidy felt the President was "extremely enthusiastic" about the firm to gain a security contract with the United Arab Emirates (UAE), in 2018, Broidy intended to take a business trip with George Nader to meet with the Crown Prince of Saudi Arabia, in order to pitch the prince a $650 million contract with Circinus. The plan fell apart when F.B.I. agents detained Nader upon his arrival at Dulles Airport.

In October 2017, in a private meeting with president Donald Trump, Broidy praised a paramilitary force his company Circinus was creating for the United Arab Emirates (UAE). He urged the president to meet with the UAE's military commander Crown Prince Mohammed bin Zayed al-Nahyan, to support the UAE's hawkish policies in the Middle East, and to fire United States Secretary of State Rex Tillerson. He was also harshly critical of Qatar, an American ally at odds with the UAE. Revealed on March 22, 2018, after Tillerson had been fired, Broidy had been allegedly paid $2.6 million from George Nader to lobby the White House on behalf of the best interests of both the UAE and Saudi Arabia and against Qatar. In March 2018, The New York Times reported that Lebanese-American businessman George Nader "worked for more than a year to turn Broidy into an instrument of influence at the White House for the rulers of Saudi Arabia and the United Arab Emirates, according to interviews and previously undisclosed documents. ...High on the agenda of the two men...was pushing the White House to remove Secretary of State Rex W. Tillerson, backing confrontational approaches to Iran and Qatar and repeatedly pressing the president to meet privately outside the White House with the leader of the U.A.E."

In the end, Nader and Broidy’s anti-Qatar operation lost its momentum and failed. There has been no traction on the effort to get the base in Qatar moved to the UAE. In late April, Secretary of State Mike Pompeo called for an end to the fighting among Saudi Arabia, the UAE and Qatar during a trip to the Gulf.  Nader pleaded guilty to child exploitation charges and was sentenced to 10 years in prison as a repeat offender.

New York State Common Pension Fund conviction
In 2002, Broidy founded Markstone Capital Partners, a private equity firm which invested in companies in Israel. The lead investor was the New York State Common Pension Fund. The pension fund invested $250 million with Markstone. After falling under investigation by then New York attorney general Andrew Cuomo, in 2009, Broidy entered a guilty plea to a single felony count of attempting to provide excess gratuity to former New York State Comptroller Alan Hevesi. The charge was later reduced to a misdemeanor in exchange for cooperation that helped lead to the conviction of Hevesi and six other pension officials. Broidy had provided $1 million in illegal gifts to New York State pension authorities. The gifts included luxury trips to Israel, payouts, and an undisclosed investment in a film produced by the brother of the chief investment officer of the New York State Retirement Fund. In exchange for the gifts, the state pension fund had invested $250 million with Markstone Capital Partners. As part of the plea deal, Broidy paid $18 million in restitution of management fees paid by the pension fund to Markstone and resigned from the chairmanship of Markstone.

Donald Trump administration
In 2016, Broidy served as a vice chairman of the Trump Victory Committee, a joint fundraising committee between the Donald Trump campaign and the RNC. In addition, he served as a vice-chairman of the Presidential Inaugural Committee. In April 2017, Broidy was named one of three national deputy finance chairmen of the RNC, along with Trump's lawyer Michael Cohen and the businessman Louis DeJoy.

After Trump won the election, Broidy used his connections to the president to recruit international clients for his security business Circinus, promising that he could arrange meetings with Trump or other high government officials. He obtained defense contracts worth more than $200 million from the United Arab Emirates. Many of his clients had unsavory records. Broidy offered inauguration tickets to Denis Sassou-Nguesso, a Congolese strongman whose lavish lifestyle was paid by public funds. He arranged for an Angolan politician João Lourenço to meet with Republican senators and offered him a trip to Mar-A-Lago. Liviu Dragnea, a Romanian parliamentarian jailed for corruption in May 2019, got to attend an inauguration party and pose for pictures with the president. He attempted to expand Circinus assistance with Tunisia through Tunisians Eymen Errais and Fadhel Abdelkefi and with Cyprus allowing Circinus to create a "misatrributed environment" in which information and surveillance would be laundered through the United States masking a foreign government's actions and reducing "the risk of being exposed to Google analytics or compromising the IP addresses of the machine or network originating the search."

In April 2017, Broidy was appointed as deputy finance chairman of the Republican National Committee (RNC).

In March 2018, Broidy filed a lawsuit against Qatar, alleging that Qatar's government stole and leaked his emails in order to discredit him because he was viewed "as an impediment to their plan to improve the country's standing in Washington." In May 2018, the lawsuit named Mohammed bin Hamad bin Khalifa Al Thani, brother of the Emir of Qatar, and his associate Ahmed Al-Rumaihi, as allegedly orchestrating Qatar's cyber warfare campaign against Broidy. Broidy accused UN diplomat Jamal Benomar of being a secret Qatari agent, and filed suit for the alleged hacking. In the case Broidy Capital Management LLC v. Jamal Benomar, it was determined that Jamal Benomar (of Qatar) had diplomatic immunity that prevented him from facing litigation. As per the Vienna Convention on Diplomatic Relations, diplomatic immunity is subject to waiver if the diplomat engaged in commercial activity. In this case, it was not proven that Benomar had engaged in said commercial activity. The appellate court determined that there was not sufficient evidence to waive Benomar's diplomatic immunity, and the case was dismissed.

Beginning in March 2018, Broidy became embroiled in a criminal investigation launched by the Prosecutor General of Ukraine for Broidy's June 12, 2014, deal to provide political support for VTB Bank and Investment Capital Ukraine (ICU), which acts as a financial advisor to President of Ukraine Petro Poroshenko. Broidy was to receive five payments of $2.5 million each through the British Virgin Islands firm with a Dubai address, Quillas Equities SA, which has Yuri Soloviev as a large shareholder according to the Panama Papers. Yuri Soloviev is a member of the management board for VTB and is the first deputy president and chairman of its management board. Yuri Soloviev's Quillas Equities has accounts in the Swiss Pictet Bank through which money transfers often occur to the VTB-owned bank in Cyprus, RCB Cyprus. In early 2014, VTB fell under numerous international sanctions due to Russia attacking Ukraine.

On April 13, 2018, Broidy resigned as deputy finance chairman of Republican National Committee (RNC) amid allegations of a relationship with Shera Bechard. To ensure that Bechard would not disclose the relationship, the $1.6 million payments beginning in 2017 to McDougal, which was arranged by Michael Cohen, was allegedly very similar to the payment Cohen made to Stormy Daniels which came from accounts that Cohen had established to receive very large sums from Viktor Vekselberg associated firms in the Renova Group and others. Both Vekselberg, who is very close to Vladimir Putin, and his Renova Group fell under United States sanctions on April 6, 2018, which froze $1.5-$2 billion of Vekselberg's assets.

Sex scandal
On April 13, 2018, The Wall Street Journal reported that Broidy had a sexual relationship with Playboy Playmate Shera Bechard, resulting in a pregnancy in late 2017. The model later had an abortion. Donald Trump's personal lawyer Michael Cohen negotiated for Broidy to pay $1.6 million for the woman's silence. The settlement was falsely characterized at the time as a personal injury settlement. In response to the Journal article, Broidy issued a statement acknowledging that he had had a "consensual relationship with a Playboy Playmate", that Cohen had contacted him after being approached by the woman's attorney, Keith M. Davidson, and that Broidy had then hired Cohen to work out a non-disclosure agreement. Broidy resigned his post at the RNC the same day the article appeared. A few days later Cohen confirmed in court that Broidy was one of the three clients he had given legal advice to in the previous year. Some columnists have since speculated that Donald Trump was really the person who had the affair with Bechard, with Broidy agreeing to provide cover for Trump. Broidy's lawyer, Chris Clark, stated that Broidy will withhold forthcoming payments to Bechard due to an alleged breach of the non-disclosure agreement on her part. On July 6, 2018, Bechard filed a lawsuit against Broidy and the attorney Michael Avenatti, in relation to the cessation of the settlement payments. Bechard has alleged in a complaint that Broidy was physically, sexually, and emotionally abusive of her, and that he exposed her to herpes. Broidy has denied the allegations. On September 7, 2018, California Superior Court Judge Elizabeth White granted Broidy's request to strike allegations from the case going forward that were not relevant to the breach-of-contract dispute.

Recent business
A July 2018 report revealed that Broidy had paid Rick Gates, Donald Trump's former campaign chairman, at least $125,000 for "advice and business insight." Gates had been indicted in October 2017 as a result of the probe by special counsel Robert Mueller into Russian interference in the 2016 presidential election. The payments began in March 2017 and went on until at least July.

In June 2020, a 112-page legal filing was submitted by Broidy in a federal court in New York, in which he accused Qatar of paying tens of millions of dollars to Global Risk Advisors (GRA), including its chief executive Kevin Chalker, for years to hack, surveil, and silence American citizens who criticized Qatar.

The Global Risk Advisors sent email messages, purporting to be from Google's security team, which got Broidy's wife and his executive assistant to provide passwords for their personal gmail accounts.
 
In August 2020, The Wall Street Journal reported that Broidy was hired by Sun Lijun, the former deputy head of China's Ministry of Public Security, to lobby the Trump administration to extradite Guo Wengui, a fugitive billionaire. Guo has become an ally of former Trump White House adviser Steve Bannon.

Involvement with 1MDB, federal indictment, guilty plea, and pardon 

In March 2018, The Wall Street Journal reported that Broidy had been in negotiations to earn tens of millions of dollars by lobbying the U.S. Justice Department to drop its investigation into a multibillion-dollar graft, the 1Malaysia Development Berhad scandal involving a Malaysian state investment fund, 1MDB, according to emails reviewed by the Journal. One email showed a proposal that would have given Broidy and his wife $75 million if they got the Justice Department to drop its probe into 1MDB. Broidy also prepared talking points for Malaysian Prime Minister Najib Razak to use with President Trump during his 2017 visit to Washington, D.C. This included playing up Malaysia's relationship with the U.S. in fighting North Korea, and arguing against pursuing legal action against 1MDB. Najib would eventually be convicted of corruption by a Malaysian court. The Department of Justice is investigating whether the Trump Victory Committee took a $100,000 donation from Malaysian businessman and international fugitive Jho Low, who is accused of being the mastermind of the 1MDB fraud.

In November 2018, The New York Times reported that Federal prosecutors accused Broidy of involvement in a scheme to launder millions of dollars into the United States to help Jho Low end a Justice Department investigation into the embezzlement of billions of dollars from 1MDB.

On October 8, 2020, federal prosecutors announced that they were charging Broidy with conspiring to act as a foreign agent as he lobbied the Trump administration on behalf of Malaysian and Chinese government interests, a felony. On October 20, 2020 Broidy pleaded guilty to these charges. As part of his plea deal, Broidy agreed to forfeit $6.6 million to the federal government. The felony to which Broidy pleaded guilty carries a prison sentence of up to five years.
On January 19, 2021 Broidy was granted a full pardon by President Donald J. Trump.

On June 11, 2021, the U. S. Department of Justice charged associates of Mr. Broidy. "Low Taek Jho, 39, also known as Jho Low, and Prakazrel “Pras” Michel, 48, are alleged to have conspired with Elliott Broidy" related to their "... engaging in undisclosed lobbying campaigns at the direction of Low and the Vice Minister of Public Security for the People's Republic of China".

Post Trump administration
On 5 August 2021, a lawsuit was filed by a Qatari luxury travel company, Mosafer Inc., according to which Elliott Broidy was paid millions of dollars by the United Arab Emirates to orchestrate a disinformation campaign against Qatar and for illegally lobbying the US federal officials to take "anti-Qatari" stance.

Philanthropic and nonprofit activities
In 2006, Bush appointed Broidy to the board of trustees of the John F. Kennedy Center for the Performing Arts.

Broidy served on the board of governors and the endowment committee of Hebrew Union College and the board of trustees of the Hillel Foundation, as well as the Center for Investment Studies at the Marshall School of Business at his alma mater, the University of Southern California. He served on the board of governors of the Cedars-Sinai Medical Center and the board of trustees of the Simon Wiesenthal Center. He was the 2008 recipient of the Raoul Wallenberg Award by the Raoul Wallenberg Committee of the United States for his Jewish philanthropy.

Personal life
Broidy is married to Robin Rosenzweig, a former senior executive of 20th Century Fox. After residing in Holmby Hills, they moved to Bel Air in 2005. In 2001, they rented their Bel Air house to Angelina Jolie but, later, tore it down, built their own dream home and currently reside at that location in a mansion similar to the Howard Phipps Jr. owned Erchless at Old Westbury in Long Island. The couple have three children.

See also
 1Malaysia Development Berhad scandal

References

1957 births
Living people
People from Bel Air, Los Angeles
Marshall School of Business alumni
American political fundraisers
American venture capitalists
Philanthropists from California
California Republicans
Film producers from California
Jewish American philanthropists
American people convicted of bribery
People from Holmby Hills, Los Angeles
Recipients of American presidential pardons
21st-century American Jews